Bayard Taylor "Bill" Sheffler (23 August 1917 in El Paso, Texas – 28 June 1949 in Trenton, New Jersey) was an American racecar driver active during the 1940s.

Sheffler attended the University of Southern California, where he was a pole vaulter on the track team. He began racing in Southern California, and was a dominant driver in big car races at Southern Ascot Speedway in South Gate, California prior to World War II.

Sheffler made 15 AAA Championship Car starts, including the 1946 Indianapolis 500 where he finished 9th, and eleven races in 1948, when he finished fourth in the National Championship. He died from injuries sustained in a practice crash prior to the 1949 Championship Car race at Trenton Speedway.

Indy 500 results

References

1917 births
1949 deaths
Sheffler,Bill
People from El Paso, Texas
Racing drivers from El Paso, Texas
Racing drivers from Texas
Racing drivers who died while racing
Sports deaths in New Jersey
AAA Championship Car drivers